ICD-10 is the 10th revision of the International Statistical Classification of Diseases and Related Health Problems (ICD), a medical classification list by the World Health Organization (WHO). It contains codes for diseases, signs and symptoms, abnormal findings, complaints, social circumstances, and external causes of injury or diseases. Work on ICD-10 began in 1983, became endorsed by the Forty-third World Health Assembly in 1990, and was first used by member states in 1994. It was replaced by ICD-11 on January 1, 2022.

While WHO manages and publishes the base version of the ICD, several member states have modified it to better suit their needs. In the base classification, the code set allows for more than 14,000 different codes and permits the tracking of many new diagnoses compared to the preceding ICD-9. Through the use of optional sub-classifications, ICD-10 allows for specificity regarding the cause, manifestation, location, severity, and type of injury or disease. The adapted versions may differ in a number of ways, and some national editions have expanded the code set even further; with some going so far as to add procedure codes. ICD-10-CM, for example, has over 70,000 codes.

The WHO provides detailed information regarding the ICD via its website – including an ICD-10 online browser and ICD training materials. The online training includes a support forum, a self-learning tool and user guide.

Chapters
The following table lists the chapter number (using Roman numerals), the code range of each chapter, and the chapter's title from the international version of the ICD-10.

National adoptions
Approximately 27 countries use ICD-10 for reimbursement and resource allocation in their health system, and some have made modifications to ICD to better accommodate its utility. The unchanged international version of ICD-10 is used in 117 countries for performing cause of death reporting and statistics.

The national versions may differ from the base classification in the level of detail, incomplete adoption of a category, or the addition of procedure codes.

Australia
Introduced in 1998, ICD-10 Australian Modification (ICD-10-AM) was developed by the National Centre for Classification in Health at the University of Sydney. It is currently maintained by the Australian Consortium for Classification Development.

ICD-10-AM has also been adopted by New Zealand, the Republic of Ireland, Saudi Arabia and several other countries.

Brazil
Brazil introduced ICD-10 in 1996.

Canada
Canada began using ICD-10 for mortality reporting in 2000. A six-year, phased implementation of ICD-10-CA for morbidity reporting began in 2001. It was staggered across Canada's ten provinces, with Quebec the last to make the switch.

ICD-10-CA is available in both English- and French-language versions.

China
China adopted ICD-10 in 2002.

Czech Republic
The Czech Republic adopted ICD-10 in 1994, one year after its official release by WHO. Revisions to the international edition are adopted continuously. The official Czech translation of ICD-10 2016 10th Revision was published in 2018.

Denmark
ICD-10 was first introduced into the psychiatric health service system on 1 January 1994.

Estonia
Estonia adopted ICD-10 from January 1, 1997, via a ministerial degree. However, chapter V "Mental and behavioural disorders" had already been in use from January 1, 1994, also via a ministerial degree.

France
France introduced a clinical addendum to ICD-10 in 1997.  See also website of the ATIH.

Germany
Germany's ICD-10 German Modification (ICD-10-GM) is based on ICD-10-AM. ICD-10-GM was developed between 2003 and 2004, by the German Institute for Medical Documentation and Information.

Hungary
Hungary introduced the use of ICD-10 from January 1, 1996, via a ministerial decree.

Korea
A Korean modification has existed since 2008.

Netherlands
The Dutch translation of ICD-10 is ICD10-nl, which was created by the WHO-FIC Network in 1994. There is an online dictionary.

Russia 
The Ministry of Healthcare of the Russian Federation ordered in 1997 to transfer all health organizations to ICD-10.

South Africa
ICD-10 was implemented in July 2005 under the auspice of the National ICD-10 Implementation Task Team which is a joint task team between the National Department of Health and the Council for Medical Schemes.

Sweden
The current Swedish translation of ICD-10 was created in 1997.

Thailand
The ICD-10-TM (Thai Modification) is a Thai language version based on the 2016 ICD-10. An unusual feature of the index of ICD-10-TM is that it is bilingual, containing both Thai and English trails.

United Kingdom
ICD-10 was first mandated for use in the UK in 1995. In 2010 the UK Government made a commitment to update the UK version of ICD-10 every three years. On 1 April 2016, following a year's delay, ICD-10 5th Edition replaced the 4th Edition as the mandated diagnostic classification within the UK, and remains the current version for use within the UK.

United States

For disease reporting, the US utilizes its own national variant of ICD-10 called the ICD-10 Clinical Modification (ICD-10-CM). A procedural classification called ICD-10 Procedure Coding System (ICD-10-PCS) has also been developed for capturing inpatient procedures. The ICD-10-CM and ICD-10-PCS were developed by the Centers for Medicare and Medicaid Services (CMS) and the National Center for Health Statistics (NCHS). There are over 70,000 ICD-10-PCS procedure codes and over 69,000 ICD-10-CM diagnosis codes, compared to about 3,800 procedure codes and roughly 14,000 diagnosis codes found in the previous ICD-9-CM.

There was much controversy when the transition from the ICD-9-CM to the ICD-10-CM was first announced in the US. Many providers were concerned about the vast number of codes being added, the complexity of the new coding system, and the costs associated with the transition. The Centers for Medicare and Medicaid Services (CMS) weighed these concerns against the benefits of having more accurate data collection, clearer documentation of diagnoses and procedures, and more accurate claims processing. CMS decided the financial and public health cost associated with continuing to use the ICD-9-CM was too high and mandated the switch to ICD-10-CM.

The deadline for the United States to begin using ICD-10-CM for diagnosis coding and Procedure Coding System ICD-10-PCS for inpatient hospital procedure coding was set at October 1, 2015, a year later than the previous 2014 deadline. Before the 2014 deadline, the previous deadline had been a year before that on October 1, 2013. All HIPAA "covered entities" were required to make the change; a pre-requisite to ICD-10-CM is the adoption of EDI Version 5010 by January 1, 2012. Enforcement of 5010 transition by the Centers for Medicare & Medicaid Services (CMS), however, was postponed by CMS until March 31, 2012, with the federal agency citing numerous factors, including slow software upgrades.  The implementation of ICD-10-CM has been subject to previous delays. In January 2009, the date was pushed back to October 1, 2013, rather than an earlier proposal of October 1, 2011.

Two common complaints in the United States about the ICD-10-CM are 1) the long list of potentially relevant codes for a given condition (such as rheumatoid arthritis) which can be confusing and reduce efficiency and 2) the assigned codes for seldom seen conditions (e.g. W55.22XA: Struck by cow, initial encounter; and V91.07XA: Burn due to water-skis on fire, initial encounter).

Criticism 
The expansion of healthcare delivery systems and changes in global health trends prompted a need for codes with improved clinical accuracy and specificity. The alphanumeric coding in ICD-10 is an improvement from ICD-9 which had a limited number of codes and a restrictive structure. Early concerns in the implementation of ICD-10 included the cost and the availability of resources for training healthcare workers and professional coders.

See also
 Diagnostic and Statistical Manual of Mental Disorders, used in psychiatry
 DSM-5: its current version

Notes

References

External links

 
 ICD-10 online browser (WHO)
 ICD-10 online training direct access (WHO)
 ICD-10-CM (USA – modification) at Centers for Disease Control and Prevention. (CDC)
 ICD-11 Home Page

International Classification of Diseases